The following is an episode list for the Bosnian television series Lud, zbunjen, normalan, which airs on FTV and Nova BH. The series premiered on 2 September 2007. All episodes are written by Feđa Isović, and directed by Elmir Jukić.

Season 1 (2007–2008)

Season 2 (2008–2009)

Season 3 (2010)

Season 4 (2011)

Season 5 (2012–2013)

Season 6 (2014–2015)

Season 7 (2015)

Season 8 (2015)

Season 9 (2015–2016)

Season 10 (2016)

Season 11 (2020)

Season 12 (2020–2021)

Season 13 (2021)

External links

ludzbunjennormalan.blogger.ba

Episodes
Lists of Bosnian television series episodes
Lists of comedy television series episodes